Kaya is the fifth largest city in Burkina Faso, lying northeast of Ouagadougou, to which it is connected by railway. It is a centre for weaving and tanning.

Kaya is the capital of Sanmatenga Province.

Demographics 
Kaya has a population of 121,970 (2019 census).

Population growth:

Infrastructure 

Kaya Airport is a public airport in Kaya. As of 2014 it did not have any scheduled commercial flights.

In 1988 Kaya was connected by railway to Ouagadougou but, as of 2014, there were no passenger services available.

Kaya is a road junction for the N3 and N15 national highways that link the city with Dori, Ouagadougou and  Pouytenga, Boulsa, Kongoussi and Ouahigouya, respectively.

Education 
technical college for girls
secondary school

Climate 
Köppen-Geiger climate classification system classifies its climate as hot semi-arid (BSh).

Sister cities 
  Herzogenaurach, Germany
  Châtellerault, France 
  Savannah, Georgia, United States

See also 
 List of cities in Burkina Faso

References 

Populated places in the Centre-Nord Region
Sanmatenga Province